Early legislative elections were held in New Caledonia on 1 July 1979 after the Government Council was dismissed by the French government and the High Commissioner dissolved the Assembly elected in 1977.

Background
In March 1979 the Government Council of New Caledonia – controlled by the pro-independence Caledonian Union – was dismissed by the French government after failing to vote in favour of a ten-year plan for the territory. High Commissioner Claude Charbonniaud given executive power.

A 10% electoral threshold was introduced for the elections, which was reported by Pacific Islands Monthly to mainly affect the prospects of indigenous and pro-independence parties. As a result, the pro-independence Caledonian Union, Caledonian Socialist Party, Melanesian Progressive Union, Party of Kanak Liberation and United Front of Kanak Liberation formed the Independence Front.

Results

Elected members

References

New Caledonia
Elections in New Caledonia
1979 in New Caledonia